Early Station is an extinct town in Helt Township, Vermillion County, in the U.S. state of Indiana.

A few buildings in the community exist, and it is still cited by the USGS.

Geography

References

Former populated places in Vermillion County, Indiana
Former populated places in Indiana